Matthew A. Tyner is an American baseball coach and former outfielder and third baseman, who is the current head baseball coach of the Towson Tigers. He played college baseball at the University of Miami for coach Ron Fraser from 1977 to 1980 and played in Minor League Baseball (MiLB) for 4 seasons from 1980 to 1983. He served as the head coach of the Bellarmine Knights (2012–2013).

Playing career
Tyner attended the University of Miami, to play college baseball for the Miami Hurricanes baseball team. Tyner helped the Hurricanes to 3 consecutive berths in the College World Series from 1978 to 1980. He was drafted in the 9th round of the 1980 Major League Baseball draft by the Baltimore Orioles. Tyner played three seasons in the Orioles system before a series of elbow injuries forced him to retire.

Coaching career
Tyner became a coach with the Butler Bulldogs baseball program in 1993. Tyner left the program in 1997. After spending a decade with the Indiana Bulls, Tyner returned to Butler as an assistant in 2009.

On June 14, 2011, Tyner was named the head coach of the Bellarmine Knights baseball program. Tyner went 60–46 in two seasons with the Knights. He led the team to a 2013 Great Lakes Valley Conference (GLVC) regular season and tournament championship. The Knights went 4–2 in the Midwest Regional.

In 2014, Tyner was hired as an assistant for the Richmond Spiders baseball program.

On June 22, 2017, Tyner left Richmond to accept the head coaching position of the Towson Tigers baseball program.

Head coaching record

See also
 List of current NCAA Division I baseball coaches

References

External links

Butler Bulldogs bio
Towson Tigers bio

Living people
1958 births
Baseball third basemen
Miami Hurricanes baseball players
Miami Orioles players
Hagerstown Suns players
Charlotte O's players
Butler Bulldogs baseball coaches
Richmond Spiders baseball coaches
Towson Tigers baseball coaches
Bellarmine Knights baseball coaches
Sportspeople from Decatur, Illinois
Baseball coaches from Illinois
Baseball players from Illinois